Torrejón de Ardoz is a municipality of Spain belonging to the Community of Madrid.

The European Union Satellite Centre (SatCen), an agency of the European Union, is located in Torrejón de Ardoz. It is also the location of the headquarters of the Instituto Nacional de Técnica Aeroespacial (INTA), the Spanish space agency.

The Torrejón Air Base/Madrid–Torrejón Airport also lies on the municipality.

Etymology 
Torrejón comes from torre ("tower"); the suffix -jón is a diminutive that ultimately makes reference to the small or unimportant nature of the noun. The Ardoz add-on comes from the namesake creek.

History 
While there is no certainty of the origin of Torrejón de Ardoz, it probably dates from the 12th century, associated to fortifications built to protect Alcalá de Henares. It was part of the Land of Alcalá for all purposes until 1554, when it was granted the status of town.

In 1843 it was the place of a short battle between general Ramón Narvaez and senator Antonio Seoane, as part of the rebellion against Espartero.

The United States Air Force jointly occupied the Torrejón Air Base, installed in 1955, under agreements made with Francisco Franco. The base was subject of criticism since its beginnings and a meeting place of pacifist demonstrations attended by progressives and ecologists.

One of the election platforms of Felipe González's Spanish Socialist Workers' Party (PSOE) was to close the base to the American fighter wing. Once González became prime minister, the lease of the then 401st Tactical Fighter Wing (now the 401st Air Expeditionary Group) was not renewed and the F-16 fighter wing left the base in the early 1990s.

Geography

Location 

It is located to the east of the city of Madrid, near the A-2, the highway connecting Madrid and Barcelona. With the city located at the right-bank (north) of the Henares the relief of the municipality gently decreases in elevation from north to south.

Three small creeks pass through the municipality emptying into the Henares. From West to East: Arroyo del Valle, Arroyo Pelayo, and Arroyo Ardoz.

The highest point lies in the North of the municipality, standing at 623 m above sea level.

The municipality has a total area of 32.49 km2.

Climate

Famous people from Torrejón de Ardoz
Artists
 El Chojin, rapper
 Pilar Rubio, television presenter
Military personnel
 Frederick M. Padilla, U.S. Marine major general
Politicians
 Kate Brown, governor of Oregon
Sportpeople
 David Andújar, footballer
 Wallace Bryant, basketball player
 Jorge Garbajosa, basketball player
 Guti, footballer
 Antonio Guzmán Núñez, footballer
 Kane, wrestler
 Sergio Mora, footballer
 Mario Rivillos Plaza, futsal player
 Manuel Romero, footballer
Crime
Patrick Nogueira, murderer. Lived with his uncle, aunt and cousins before his family moved to Pioz.

References
Citations

Bibliography

See also
Municipal elections in Torrejón de Ardoz
Madrid-Torrejón Airport

Municipalities in the Community of Madrid